Ænigma or Aenigma may refer to:

 Aenigma (beetle), a genus of ground beetles
 Aenigma, the former name of a genus of jumping spiders from South Africa, now called Zulunigma
 Aenigma (film), a 1988 horror film by Lucio Fulci
 Ænigma (In Vain album), 2013 progressive death metal album
 "Aenigma", 2002 song by Luca Turilli from Prophet of the Last Eclipse, a symphonic power metal album

See also
 Enigma (disambiguation)